Curt Haagers -88 is a 1988 Curt Haagers studio album. It peaked at No. 38 in the Swedish albums chart.

Track listing
Den blinda flickan - (trad. arr: Lars O.Carlsson lyrics: Laila Westersund)
Drömmer om dej (Wom Winde Werweht) - (J.Frankfurter-K.Almgren)
Mary Bell - (Melodifestivalen 1988 song) (P.Sahlin-S.Wigfors)
När du går över floden (P.Karlsson)
Volare (instrumental) - (D.Modugno)
Mona Mona - (Candy de Rouge-P.Hermansson
Låt oss börja om på nytt - (J.Vison)
Nu har det hänt igen - (H.Rytterström)
Mio min Mio - (Benny Andersson-Björn Ulvaeus)
Min Angelique - (B.Månsson)
Marina - (Rocco Granata-Owe Meier-Leggard)
Gör det igen - (M.Rådberg-I.Forsman)
Alla människor på vår jord - (Seller-Marcus-Benjemen-P.Hermansson)
En kväll i Spanien - (The Spanish Night is over) (D.Grabowski-Simons-Niehaus-Spiro-C.Lundh

Charts

References 

1988 albums
Curt Haagers albums